Shamir's secret sharing (SSS) is an efficient secret sharing algorithm for distributing private information (the "secret") among a group so that the secret cannot be revealed unless a quorum of the group acts together to pool their knowledge. To achieve this, the secret is mathematically divided into parts (the "shares") from which the secret can be reassembled only when a sufficient number of shares are combined. SSS has the property of information-theoretic security, meaning that even if an attacker steals some shares, it is impossible for the attacker to reconstruct the secret unless they have stolen the quorum number of shares.

Shamir's secret sharing is used in some applications to share the access keys to a master secret.

High-level explanation

SSS is used to secure a secret in a distributed form, most often to secure encryption keys. The secret is split into multiple shares, which individually do not give any information about the secret.

To reconstruct a secret secured by SSS, a number of shares is needed, called the threshold. No information about the secret can be gained from any number of shares below than the threshold (a property called perfect secrecy). In this sense, SSS is a generalisation of the one-time pad (which can be viewed as SSS with a two-share threshold and two shares in total).

Application example 
A company needs to secure their vault. If a single person knows the code to the vault, the code might be lost or unavailable when the vault needs to be opened. If there are several people who know the code, they may not trust each other to always act honestly.
SSS can be used in this situation to generate shares of the vault's code which are distributed to authorized individuals in the company. The minimum threshold and number of shares given to each individual can be selected such that the vault is accessible only by (groups of) authorized individuals. If fewer shares than the threshold are presented, the vault cannot be opened.
By accident or as an act of opposition, some individuals might present incorrect information for their shares. If the total of correct shares fails to meet the minimum threshold, the vault remains locked.

Use cases 
Shamir's secret sharing can be used to

 share a key for decrypting the root key of a password manager,
 recover a user key for encrypted email access and
 sharing of the passphrase used to recreate a master secret, which is in turn used to access a cryptocurrency wallet.

Properties and weaknesses 

SSS has useful properties, but also weaknesses that mean that it is unsuited to some uses.

Useful properties include:

 Secure: The scheme has information-theoretic security.
 Minimal: The size of each piece does not exceed the size of the original data.
 Extensible: For any given threshold, shares can be dynamically added or deleted without affecting existing shares
 Dynamic: Security can be enhanced without changing the secret, but by changing the polynomial occasionally (keeping the same free term) and constructing a new share for each of the participants.
 Flexible: In organizations where hierarchy is important, each participant can be issued different numbers of shares according to their importance inside the organization. For instance, with a threshold of 3, the president could unlock the safe alone if given three shares, while three secretaries with one share each must combine their shares to unlock the safe.

Weaknesses include:

 No verifiable secret sharing: During the share reassembly process, SSS does not provide a way to verify the correctness of each share being used. Verifiable secret sharing aims to verify that shareholders are honest and not submitting fake shares.
 Single point of failure: The secret must exist in one place when it is split into shares, and again in one place when it is reassembled. These are attack points, and other schemes including multisignature eliminate at least one of these single points of failure.

History

Adi Shamir first formulated the scheme in 1979.

Mathematical principle

For instance, 2 points are sufficient to define a line, 3 points are sufficient to define a parabola, 4 points to define a cubic curve and so forth.

Mathematical formulation

Shamir's secret sharing is an ideal and perfect -threshold scheme based on polynomial interpolation over finite fields. In such a scheme, the aim is to divide a secret  (for example, the combination to a safe) into  pieces of data  (known as shares) in such a way that: 
 Knowledge of any  or more shares  makes  computable. That is, the entire secret  can be reconstructed from any combination of  shares.
 Knowledge of any  or fewer shares  leaves  completely undetermined, in the sense that the possible values for  remain as likely with knowledge of up to  shares as with knowledge of  shares. The secret  cannot be reconstructed with fewer than  shares.

If , then all of the shares are needed to reconstruct the secret .

Assume that the secret  can be represented as an element  of a finite field  (where  is greater than the number  of shares being generated). Compute any  points out on the curve, for instance set  to find points . Every participant is given a point (a non-zero input to the polynomial, and the corresponding output). Note that  is equal to the first coefficient of polynomial .

Example calculation
The following example illustrates the basic idea. Note, however, that calculations in the example are done using integer arithmetic rather than using finite field arithmetic to make the idea easier to understand. Therefore the example below does not provide perfect secrecy and is not a proper example of Shamir's scheme. The next example will explain the problem.

Preparation 
Suppose that the secret to be shared is 1234 .

In this example, the secret will be split into 6 shares , where any subset of 3 shares  is sufficient to reconstruct the secret.  numbers are taken at random. Let them be 166 and 94.
 This yields coefficients  where  is the secret

The polynomial to produce secret shares (points) is therefore:
 

Six points  from the polynomial are constructed as:
 

This is necessary because  is the secret.

Reconstruction 
In order to reconstruct the secret, any 3 points are sufficient

Consider using the 3 points.

Computing the Lagrange basis polynomials:

 

 

 

Using the formula for polynomial interpolation,  is:

 

Recalling that the secret is the free coefficient, which means that , and the secret has been recovered.

Computationally efficient approach 
Using polynomial interpolation to find a coefficient in a source polynomial  using Lagrange polynomials is not efficient, since unused constants are calculated.

Considering this, an optimized formula to use Lagrange polynomials to find  is defined as follows:

Problem of using integer arithmetic 

But she  could combine the information from the 2 points with the public information: . Doing so, Eve could perform the following algebra:

 Fill (1) with the values of 's  and 
 Fill  (1) with the values of 's  and 
Eve knows that  so she starts replacing  in (4) with 0, 1, 2, 3, ... to find all possible values for :
 
 
 
 
 
 
Eve can now conclude 
 Now, Eve can replace  by (4) in (2): . Now, replacing  in (6) by the values found in (5), she gets  which leads her to the information: 
Eve now only has 150 numbers to guess from instead of an infinite quantity of natural numbers.

Solution using finite field arithmetic 

The above attack exploits constraints on the values that the polynomial may take by virtue of how it was constructed: the polynomial must have coefficients that are natural numbers, and the polynomial must take a natural number as value when evaluated at each of the coordinates used in the scheme. This reduces its possible values at unknown points, including the resultant secret, given fewer than  shares.

This problem can be remedied by using finite field arithmetic. A field of size  is used as an example. The figure shows a polynomial curve over a finite field. In contrast to a smooth curve it appears disorganised and disjointed.

In practice this is only a small change. The order of the field (i.e. the number of values that it has) must be chosen to be is greater than the number of participants and the number of values of the secret ). All calculations involving the polynomial must also be calculated over the field (mod p in our example) instead of over the integers.  Both the choice of the field and the mapping of the secret to a value in this field are considered to be publicly known. In our example, the value  is the order of the field.

For this example, choose , so the polynomial becomes  which gives the points: 

Attempting the previous attack, Eve can:

 Fill (1) with the values of 's  and 
 Fill (1) with the values of 's  and 
 Subtracts (3)-(2):  and rewrites this as 
 Using  so she starts replacing  in (4) with 0, 1, 2, 3, ... to find all possible values for :
 
 
 
 
She knows that  always decreases by 3, so if  was divisible by  she could conclude . However,  is prime she can not conclude this. Thus, using a finite field avoids this possible attack.

Python code 
"""
The following Python implementation of Shamir's secret sharing is
released into the Public Domain under the terms of CC0 and OWFa:
https://creativecommons.org/publicdomain/zero/1.0/
http://www.openwebfoundation.org/legal/the-owf-1-0-agreements/owfa-1-0

See the bottom few lines for usage. Tested on Python 2 and 3.
"""

from __future__ import division
from __future__ import print_function

import random
import functools

# 12th Mersenne Prime
_PRIME = 2 ** 127 - 1
# The 13th Mersenne Prime is 2**521 - 1

_RINT = functools.partial(random.SystemRandom().randint, 0)

def _eval_at(poly, x, prime):
    """Evaluates polynomial (coefficient tuple) at x, used to generate a
    shamir pool in make_random_shares below.
    """
    accum = 0
    for coeff in reversed(poly):
        accum *= x
        accum += coeff
        accum %= prime
    return accum

def make_random_shares(secret, minimum, shares, prime=_PRIME):
    """
    Generates a random shamir pool for a given secret, returns share points.
    """
    if minimum > shares:
        raise ValueError("Pool secret would be irrecoverable.")
    poly = [secret] + [_RINT(prime - 1) for i in range(minimum - 1)]
    points = [(i, _eval_at(poly, i, prime))
              for i in range(1, shares + 1)]
    return points

def _extended_gcd(a, b):
    """
    Division in integers modulus p means finding the inverse of the
    denominator modulo p and then multiplying the numerator by this
    inverse (Note: inverse of A is B such that A*B % p == 1). This can
    be computed via the extended Euclidean algorithm
    http://en.wikipedia.org/wiki/Modular_multiplicative_inverse#Computation
    """
    x = 0
    last_x = 1
    y = 1
    last_y = 0
    while b != 0:
        quot = a // b
        a, b = b, a % b
        x, last_x = last_x - quot * x, x
        y, last_y = last_y - quot * y, y
    return last_x, last_y

def _divmod(num, den, p):
    """Compute num / den modulo prime p

    To explain this, the result will be such that: 
    den * _divmod(num, den, p) % p == num
    """
    inv, _ = _extended_gcd(den, p)
    return num * inv

def _lagrange_interpolate(x, x_s, y_s, p):
    """
    Find the y-value for the given x, given n (x, y) points;
    k points will define a polynomial of up to kth order.
    """
    k = len(x_s)
    assert k == len(set(x_s)), "points must be distinct"
    def PI(vals):  # upper-case PI -- product of inputs
        accum = 1
        for v in vals:
            accum *= v
        return accum
    nums = []  # avoid inexact division
    dens = []
    for i in range(k):
        others = list(x_s)
        cur = others.pop(i)
        nums.append(PI(x - o for o in others))
        dens.append(PI(cur - o for o in others))
    den = PI(dens)
    num = sum([_divmod(nums[i] * den * y_s[i] % p, dens[i], p)
               for i in range(k)])
    return (_divmod(num, den, p) + p) % p

def recover_secret(shares, prime=_PRIME):
    """
    Recover the secret from share points
    (points (x,y) on the polynomial).
    """
    if len(shares) < 3:
        raise ValueError("need at least three shares")
    x_s, y_s = zip(*shares)
    return _lagrange_interpolate(0, x_s, y_s, prime)

def main():
    """Main function"""
    secret = 1234
    shares = make_random_shares(secret, minimum=3, shares=6)

    print('Secret:                                                     ',
          secret)
    print('Shares:')
    if shares:
        for share in shares:
            print('  ', share)

    print('Secret recovered from minimum subset of shares:             ',
          recover_secret(shares[:3]))
    print('Secret recovered from a different minimum subset of shares: ',
          recover_secret(shares[-3:]))

if __name__ == '__main__':
    main()

See also 
 Secret sharing
 Secure multi-party computation
 Lagrange polynomial
 Homomorphic secret sharing – a simplistic decentralized voting protocol
 Two-man rule
 Partial Password

References

Further reading 
 .
 .

External links 

 Shamir's Secret Sharing in the Crypto++ library
 Shamir's Secret Sharing Scheme (ssss) – a GNU GPL implementation
 sharedsecret – implementation in Go
 s4 - online shamir's secret sharing tool utilizing HashiCorp's shamir secret sharing algorithm

Secret sharing
Information-theoretically secure algorithms
Articles with example JavaScript code
Articles with example Python (programming language) code